Maquinchao is a village and municipality in Río Negro Province in Argentina.

Geography

Climate 
This town is located in the middle of northern Patagonia, right in the steppe. Combined with its far distance from open ocean, Maquinchao has one of the most continental variations of a cold semi-arid climate (BSk, according to the Köppen climate classification) in the country, bordering on a cold arid climate (BWk) and it can be quite extreme: temperatures can range from well above  on the hottest summer days (but with cold, desert nights at around ) to lows that might reach .
Usually, summer days average  and nights , whereas winter days average  and nights, . Snow is common, but since precipitation is generally low, quantities tend to be reduced. The weather is generally windy, especially in the spring.

References

Notes

Populated places in Río Negro Province